Mission Odyssey is a French-German animated TV series about the adventures of the ancient Greek hero Ulysses. The series is a production of BAF Berlin Animation Film GmbH & Co. Produktions KG, Marathon Filmproduktion, Maraton Animation, and M6 Metropole Television. Character design was created by David Gilson. Distributional rights were acquired in 2009 by the Your Family Entertainment AG, which is now holding indefinite broadcast rights including ancillary rights for almost all countries. The German premiere took place on 6 September 2002 on KIKA.

Plot 
After the destruction of Troy, Ulysses and his men leave for home without paying proper respect to Poseidon. For this, the Sea God punishes Ulysses to roam the seas and be unable to return home to Ithaca.

Poseidon has made a bet with Athena that Ulysses and his crew will never make it home on their own. To achieve this Poseidon interferes in every episode of the series, with Athena constantly reminding Poseidon that direct intervention violates their rules.

The series covers the most important stages of Homer's Odyssey but is simplified and re-worked in a child-friendly manner. Occasionally characters from other Greek legends are used.

Characters

Main characters
 Ulysses ― as Ithaca's famous hero, he left 10 years ago to help the Greeks in the Trojan War which they won thanks to his tricks. He plans to return home, but did not count on Poseidon, who will not lose his bet against Athena. He is voiced by Dan Green.
 Nisa ― a perpetually barefoot 13-year-old girl, and one of Ulysses' loyal comrades. She has the ability to have horrific vision of imminent doom, but none of the others believe her, or even pay attention to her warnings, because she's a little girl (in a similar way to Cassandra of myth). She is voiced by Liza Jacqueline.
 Diomedes ― a member of the crew who set off with Ulysses and the gang to seek to return to Ithaca. He is the oldest one in the group, and is deteremined to protect them from danger during the journey. He always has some advice to the others, due to his combat experience. He is voiced by James Carter Cathcart.
 Dates ― the owner of the ship and a member of the crew. He is greedy and is always on the lookout to make more money.
 Titan ― one of Ulysses' closest friends and the most powerful members of the crew. He comes from the isle of Cronos, where he was to be crowned king - but he let his brother have the throne when he joined Ulysses.
 Philo ― a member of the crew, Philo is always worried about dangers and easily frightened. He is voiced by Darren Dunstan.
 Zephyr ― the youngest member of the crew, voiced by Jason Griffith.
 Penelope ― she is Odysseus' wife, waiting for her husband to return to Ithaca. She is voiced by Collen Clinkenbeard.
 Telemachus ― Odysseus and Penelope's son, voiced by Allison Viktorin.
 Owl ― sent by Athena to observe Ulysses' journey. He usually scouts ahead the ship on the lookout for danger.

Olympian Gods and Titans
 Athena ― a Goddess of wisdom, handcraft, and warfare who guides Ulysses and the gang, along with her pet Owl, to return to his hometown Ithaca. She also ensures that Poseidon does not directly intervene to stop them. Athena is voiced by Kathleen Barr.
 Poseidon ― he is the older brother of both Zeus and Hades, and second oldest of his other siblings behind Demeter, Hera, and Hestia. Poseidon is the main antagonist, though other gods sometimes also hinder Ulysses, usually not through direct action but rather as a result of their egotism and uncontrollable fits of anger. Poseidon commands most of the other villains and antagonists throughout the series, or manipulates them to attack Ulysses. Poseidon is voiced by Stuart Zagnit.
 Hades ― god of the Underworld and brother of Zeus and Poseidon.
 Hestia ― goddess of family and the hearth, sister of Zeus.
 Gaia is the goddess of Earth. She gives Cronus - her son -  the Stones of Life and tells him to use them for creating the Universe. She is voiced by Diane Delano.
 Cronus ― primordial god and father to Zeus, Poseidon and their siblings. He was defeated and imprisoned by his offspring and cast down.

Others
 Pegasus
 Aeolus (voiced by Mei Brooks)
 Gildor (voiced by Matthew Wood)
 Hephaestus (voiced by Brian McFadden)
 Pandora (voiced by Emma Main)
 Calypso (voiced by Laura Bailey)
 Nausicaa (voiced by Veronica Taylor)
 Peleas (voiced by Philip Philmar)
 Erinyes (voiced by Tish Hicks)

Monsters and Creatures 
 Aglaope (voiced by Colleen Clinkenbeard)
 Mira (voiced by Lucy Fry)
 Circe (voiced by Kathleen Barr)
 Fates 
 Lachesis (voiced by (Carole Shelly)
 Atropos (voiced by Amanda Plummer)
 Clotho (voiced by Maya Rudolph)
 Chimera
 Kystal and Droplet (voiced by Alexandra Pic)
 Lycaon
 Telios (voiced by Scot Mc Neil)
 Aurel (voiced by Sam Vincent)
 Hardix (voiced by Scott McNeil)
 Polyphemus

Episode list 
 The Eye of the Cyclops
 Charybde and Scylla
 A Trip to the Underworld
 The Song of the Sirens
 Circe
 Memories
 The Curse of the Strygons
 Looking for Pegasus
 The Gorgon Sisters
 Wind Palace
 The Forge of Hephaestus
 Duel of the Centaur
 I Married a Harpy
 The Flame of Eternity
 Lotus Eaters
 Queen of the Amazons
 King of the Titans
 The Mirror of Attraction
 Atlantis Ascending
 The Wishing Well
 Enchanted Lyre
 Cronos' Revenge
 Dazed in the Maze
 The Golden Fleece
 Hercules' Columns
 Ulysses' Bow

References

External links 
 
 Mission Odyssey bei BAF
 Episodenführer mit Bilder

2008 German television series debuts
2000s French animated television series
Odysseus
French children's animated fantasy television series
Television shows based on the Odyssey